The 2002 Sharpie 500 was the 24th stock car race of the 2002 NASCAR Winston Cup Series and the 42nd iteration of the event. The race was held on Saturday, August 24, 2002, in Bristol, Tennessee at Bristol Motor Speedway, a 0.533 miles (0.858 km) permanent oval-shaped racetrack. The race took the scheduled 500 laps to complete. At race's end, Jeff Gordon, driving for Hendrick Motorsports, would complete a bump-and-run with less than three to go on eventual second-place finisher, Penske Racing driver Rusty Wallace, to win his 59th career NASCAR Winston Cup Series win and his first of the season. To fill out the podium, Dale Earnhardt Jr. of Dale Earnhardt, Inc. would finish third. But the race became notable for it being a night of tempers were there was 4 different instances where drivers showed their tempers to other drivers.

Background 

The Bristol Motor Speedway, formerly known as Bristol International Raceway and Bristol Raceway, is a NASCAR short track venue located in Bristol, Tennessee. Constructed in 1960, it held its first NASCAR race on July 30, 1961. Despite its short length, Bristol is among the most popular tracks on the NASCAR schedule because of its distinct features, which include extraordinarily steep banking, an all concrete surface, two pit roads, and stadium-like seating. It has also been named one of the loudest NASCAR tracks.

Entry list 

 (R) denotes rookie driver.

Practice 
Originally, three practice sessions were going to be held, with all three being held on Friday, August 23. However, due to a long rain delay during qualifying, the second practice session was canceled.

First practice 
The first practice session was held on Friday, August 23, at 11:20 AM EST, and would last for two hours.

Second practice 
The second and final practice session, sometimes referred to as Happy Hour, was held on Friday, August 23, at 6:15 PM EST, and would last for 45 minutes.

Qualifying 
Qualifying was held on Friday, August 23, at 3:05 PM EST. Each driver would have two laps to set a fastest time; the fastest of the two would count as their official qualifying lap. Positions 1-36 would be decided on time, while positions 37-43 would be based on provisionals. Six spots are awarded by the use of provisionals based on owner's points. The seventh is awarded to a past champion who has not otherwise qualified for the race. If no past champion needs the provisional, the next team in the owner points will be awarded a provisional.

Four drivers would fail to qualify: Hermie Sadler, Carl Long, Morgan Shepherd, and Tim Sauter.

Full qualifying results

Race 
Dale Earnhardt Jr. led the first lap of the race from pole sitter Jeff Gordon. The first caution flew on lap 5 when Todd Bodine, Steve Park, and Lance Hooper crashed on the backstretch. Dale Earnhardt Jr. held on to his lead on the restart of the race on lap 12. On lap 17, the second caution flew when Todd Bodine crashed on the backstretch. The race restarted on lap 23 and Dale Jr. held on to his lead. The third caution flew on lap 30 when Robby Gordon spun in turn 4. The race restarted on lap 36 and no one could catch Dale Earnhardt Jr. as Jr. went on to lead the first 130 laps of the race. After only 21 green flag laps, the fourth caution flew on lap 56 when Ricky Craven spun in turn 2 after he got dumped by Robby Gordon. On pit road during the caution, points leader Sterling Marlin was penalized for dragging his jack out of his pit box and had to go to the rear of the field. The race restarted on lap 62. On lap 68, the 5th caution flew when Elliott Sadler crashed on the backstretch after contact with Joe Nemechek. Sadler got out of his car and pointed at his head at Nemechek as Nemechek went by as if Sadler was saying "I will remember that." The race restarted on lap 76. On lap 131, Jeff Gordon took the lead from Dale Earnhardt Jr. and Gordon would go on to lead the next 116 laps of the race. After 75 green flag laps, The 6th caution flew on lap 150 when rookie star Jimmie Johnson spun in turn 4. Jeff Gordon beat out Jimmy Spencer to win the race off of pit road to keep his lead and the race restarted on lap 157. The 7th caution flew on lap 168 when multiple cars like Scott Wimmer, Terry Labonte, and Derrike Cope cut tires after running over debris. The race restarted on lap 175. On lap 247, Dale Earnhardt Jr. took the lead from Jeff Gordon. But 11 laps later on lap 257, Jeff Gordon took the lead back from Dale Jr. and Gordon would lead the next 116 laps. After the longest green flag run of 117 laps, the 8th caution flew on lap 291 when Steve Park spun in turn 2. Jeff Gordon won the race off of pit road to keep his lead. On the restart on lap 298, chaos ensued that collected a total of 9 cars. Jeremy Mayfield got turned by Dale Jarrett and Mayfield spun up and back down and clipped Jarett causing Jarrett to spin in turn 1 and collect more cars. The wreck also collected Jeff Burton, Ryan Newman, Mark Martin, Jerry Nadeau, Bobby Labonte, Michael Waltrip, and Kurt Busch. The race restarted on lap 308. On lap 315, the 10th caution flew when Ricky Craven slowed on the backstretch and was run into from behind by Jeff Green giving Green major front end damage. The race restarted on lap 331 but on lap 333, the 11th caution flew when Ryan Newman crashed in turn 4 after contact with Mark Martin. Terry Labonte also spun trying to avoid the crash. The race restarted on lap 339.

More tempers 
On lap 347, the 12th caution flew when Hut Stricklin crashed in turn 3 after contact by Jeremy Mayfield. Stricklin, making his final Winston Cup start, got out of his car and pointed and clapped at Mayfield as Mayfield went by as a show of displeasure. The race restarted on lap 356. On lap 370, the 13th caution flew when Casey Atwood and Dave Blaney crashed in turn 2. Ward Burton won the race off of pit road but many cars stayed out including Johnny Benson who was the new race leader. During the caution period, things got a little heated in the lap down lane. Rookie Jimmie Johnson, who was third in points coming into the race, was the first car that was 1 lap down and he lined up along side the second to last car on the lead lap in Mike Wallace. Behind Johnson was Robby Gordon who was the second car one lap down. During the caution period, Gordon bumped into Johnson's rear bumper a few times for what appears to be because Gordon wanted to restart in front of Johnson. As soon as they took the green flag, Gordon continued to run all over the bumper of Johnson and ended up turning him around collecting Mark Martin as well as John Andretti who spun late bringing out the 14th caution of the race. While they were racing back to the line, Gordon went all over the back bumper of race leader Johnny Benson even shoving him up the race track in an attempt to get his lap back which he did. An angry Johnson got out of his car and waited for Robby Gordon to come by. About 3 laps after the wreck, Johnson went to Gordon's car and gave him the finger and walked to the ambulance. Johnson in his interview said "just like every form of racing he's ever been it's always somebody else's fault. He had me turned before we even took the green I didn't even have a chance to grab a gear. He's beating my bumper cover off coming to the green because he wanted to restart in front of me. I'm trying to get my lap back as well so he's just crying up a river like he always does. It's a shame we got a chance to win the championship and we get spun out before we take the green on a restart it's just wrong." He also said later that he enjoyed flipping off Gordon. Eventually, NASCAR said that Gordon must come down pit road and serve a 2 lap penalty. But both Gordon and his car owner Richard Childress agrued that Johnson missed a gear shift and that there was nothing that Gordon could do about it. Gordon did eventually serve his penalty. The race restarted on lap 388. On lap 389, Kurt Busch took the lead from Benson. But the tempers did not end. On lap 403, the 15th and final caution flew when Dale Earnhardt Jr. bumped Ward Burton turning Burton around. An angry Burton got out of his car, took off his heel pads on his shoes, and went up to the apron of the race track waiting for Jr. As soon as Burton saw Jr's race car, Burton put his arms out as a gesture to Jr. and threw his brake pads at Jr's car as he went by. Burton's pads ricocheted off of Jr's car and hit Burton. NASCAR did tell Burton and his crew chief Tommy Baldwin Jr. to visit the NASCAR hauler. In his interview, Burton quoted "I wish I had something I could've shot through the window." After the tempers that flared throughout the night, TNT, who was broadcasting the event, decided to have a good sense of humor about the tempers that were shown by different drivers throughout the night. They put up a temper statline on TV that said "Mouthing Off – 1, Finger Pointing  – 3, Car Bumping – 5, Heel Pads Thrown – 2, Ambulance Abuse – 1."

Final laps 
The race restarted on lap 424 with Kurt Busch still the leader. On lap 434, Matt Kenseth took the lead from his Roush racing teammate. On lap 444, Kevin Harvick took the lead from Kenseth and held on to it for the next 38 laps. With 22 laps to go, Rusty Wallace passed Matt Kenseth for second and began to close in on Kevin Harvick. With 19 laps to go, Rusty Wallace pulled the bump and run on Harvick and took the lead. With 18 to go, Jeff Gordon passed Harvick for 2nd place. With 10 laps to go, Wallace had built a manageable lead over Gordon and it looked like Wallace was gonna win. But with the laps winding down, Jeff Gordon kept getting closer and closer to Wallace. With 4 laps to go, Wallace got loose coming out of turn 2 and Gordon was now all over the back bumper of Wallace. Gordon attempted to bump and run Wallace a couple different times but Wallace held on to his ground. Finally, with 3 laps to go in turn 3, Gordon got to the back bumper of Wallace and moved him up the race track and Gordon sneaked by Wallace and took the lead. Wallace attempted to get Gordon back in the last 2 laps but could not get to his back bumper and the defending Cup Series champion Jeff Gordon took home his first win of the 2002 season and Wallace finished 2nd. This was Gordon's first win since the 2001 Protection One 400 at Kansas. This was also Gordon's 5th and final career win at Bristol. Dale Earnhardt Jr., Matt Kenseth, and Kevin Harvick rounded out the top 5 while Kurt Busch, Sterling Marlin, Jimmy Spencer, Bobby Labonte, and Mike Wallace rounded out the top 10.

Race results

References 

2002 NASCAR Winston Cup Series
NASCAR races at Bristol Motor Speedway
August 2002 sports events in the United States
2002 in sports in Tennessee